Pérez Bonalde is a Caracas Metro station on Line 1. It was opened on 2 January 1983 as part of the inaugural section of Line 1 between Propatria and La Hoyada, and is on Catia Boulevard. The station is between Propatria and Plaza Sucre.

The station is named after Juan Antonio Pérez Bonalde, and a 1946 bust of him sits outside the entrance to the station.

References 

Caracas Metro stations
1983 establishments in Venezuela
Railway stations opened in 1983